(literally 'our language') is a group of distinct Finnish dialects or a Finnic language spoken in the northernmost part of Sweden along the valley of the Torne River. Its status as an independent language is disputed, but in Sweden it is recognized as one of the country's five minority languages.

Linguistically, Meänkieli consists of two dialect subgroups, the Torne Valley dialects (also spoken on the Finnish side of the Torne River) and the Gällivare dialects, which both belong to the larger Peräpohjola dialect group. For historical and political reasons it has the status of a minority language in Sweden. Sveriges Radio tends to use  for the culture generally and  specifically for the language.

Meänkieli is distinguished from Standard Finnish by the absence of 19th- and 20th-century developments in Finnish.

History 
Before 1809, all of what is today Finland was an integral part of Sweden. The language border went west of the Torne Valley area, so a small part of today's Sweden, along the modern border, was historically Finnish speaking (just like most areas along the eastern coast of the Gulf of Bothnia, areas that were ceded to Russia and are part of modern Finland, were historically Swedish speaking, and to a large extent still are). The area where Meänkieli is spoken that is now Finnish territory (apart from the linguistically Sami and Swedish parts of this geographical area), formed a dialect continuum within the Realm of Sweden. Since the area east of Torne River was ceded to Russia in 1809, the language developed in partial isolation from standard Finnish. In 1826 the state Church of Sweden appointed the priest and amateur botanist Lars Levi Laestadius to be the Vicar over the Karesuando parish, which is situated along the Muonio River north of the Arctic Circle on the border of Finland in Swedish Lapland. The population of Karesuando was predominantly Finnish-speaking people of Sami, Finnish, and Swedish mixed descent. 

In the 1880s, the Swedish state decided that all citizens of the country should speak Swedish. Part of the reason was military; people close to the border speaking the language of the neighbouring country rather than the major language in their own country might not be trusted in case of war. Another reason was that Finns were regarded as being of another "race." An opinion of that period, as reflected in contemporary fiction, was that the Sami and the Finnish populations belonged "more closely to Russia than to Scandinavia". Beginning around this time, the schools in the area only taught in Swedish, and children were forbidden under penalty of physical punishment from speaking their own language at school even during class breaks. Native Finnish speakers were prevented by the authorities from learning Standard Finnish as a school subject for decades, which resulted in the survival of the language only in oral form.

Meänkieli today 
On April 1, 2000, Meänkieli became one of the now five nationally recognized minority languages of Sweden, which means it can be used for some communication with local and regional authorities in the communities along the Finnish border. Its minority language status applies in designated local communities and areas, not throughout Sweden.

Few people today speak Meänkieli as their only language, with speakers usually knowing Swedish and often standard Finnish as well. Estimates of how many people speak Meänkieli vary from 30,000 to 70,000, of whom most live in Norrbotten. Many people in the northern parts of Sweden understand some Meänkieli, but fewer people speak it regularly. People with Meänkieli roots are often referred to as Tornedalians although the Finnish-speaking part of Norrbotten is a far larger area than the Torne River Valley; judging by the names of towns and places, the Finnish-speaking part of Norrbotten stretches as far west as the city of Gällivare.

Today Meänkieli is declining. Few young people speak Meänkieli as part of daily life though many have passive knowledge of the language from family use, and it is not uncommon for younger people from Meänkieli-speaking families to be more familiar with standard Finnish, for which literature and courses are much more readily available. The language is taught at Stockholm University, Luleå University of Technology, and Umeå University. Bengt Pohjanen is a trilingual author from the Torne Valley. In 1985 he wrote the first Meänkieli novel, . He has also written several novels, dramas, grammar books, songs and films in Meänkieli.

The author Mikael Niemi's novels and a film based on one of his books in Swedish have improved awareness of this minority among Swedes. Since the 1980s, people who speak Meänkieli have become more aware of the importance of the language as a marker of identity. Today there are grammar books, a Bible translation, drama performances, and there are some TV programmes in Meänkieli. 

On radio, programmes in Meänkieli are broadcast regularly from regional station P4 Norrbotten (as well as local station P6 in Stockholm) on Mondays to Thursdays between 17:10 and 18:00, while on Sundays further programmes are carried by P6 between 8:34 and 10:00 (also on P2 nationwide from 8:34 to 9:00). All of these programmes are also available via the Internet.

Status as a language
People who claim that Meänkieli is a language usually point to its literary scene, and that it has its own separate literary language, whereas others would claim that it is a generally mutually intelligible dialect, albeit in several aspects more conservative than Standard Finnish. There are also sociological, political and historical reasons. Meänkieli is very similar to the northern dialects of Finnish, but due to not having been affected by the literary language of Finland it has kept many elements that have died out in Finnish. It has also adopted many Swedish loanwords. Currently the status of Meänkieli remains controversial.

Geographical distribution 
Meänkieli has an official status in: Pajala, Övertorneå, Haparanda, Gällivare, Luleå, Kalix, Kiruna, and many speakers also live in Stockholm.

Alphabet 
 A – aa – 
 B – bee – 
 C – see – 
 D – dee – 
 E – ee – 
 F – äf – 
 G – gee – 
 H – hoo – 
 I – ii – 
 J – jii – 
 K – koo – 
 L – äl – 
 M – äm – 
 N – än – 
 O – oo – 
 P – pee – 
 Q – kuu – 
 R – är – 
 S – äs – 
 T – tee – 
 U – uu – 
 V – vee – 
 W – kaksois-vee/tupla-vee – 
 X – äks – 
 Y – yy – 
 Z – tset(a) – 
 Å – ruotti oo – 
 Ä – ää – 
 Ö – öö – 

B, C, D, G, W, X, Z, and Å are only used in foreign words and names.

in 2016 a letter š  was added into Meänkieli, instead of the Swedish letters sj.

Orthography 
 aa – 
 ee – 
 ii – 
 kk – 
 ll – 
 mm – 
 ng – 
 nk – 
 nn – 
 oo – 
 pp – 
 qu – 
 rr – 
 (before 2016) sj – 
(after 2016) š – 
 ss – 
 tj – 
 tt – 
 uu – 
 yy – 
 ää – 
 öö –

Some Meänkieli words not used in standard Finnish 
The Swedish language words are in brackets in case of borrowed cognates. With Swedish being the dominant everyday language in the region, the language has impacted modern Meänkieli in some ways.

  'apple' (äpple)
  'it is'
  'it is not'
  'to get along' (klara)
  'ugly'
  'potato' (potatis)
  'to have a habit of' (bruka)
  'along with, company' (följe)
  'when, as, since'
  'to fish' (fiska)
  'child'
  'carrot' (morot)
  'to talk'
  'to speak' (prata)
  'fork' (gaffel)
  'to try' (prova)
  'knife' (kniv)
  'to knock' (knacka)
  'to drink alcohol' (öla)
  'game'
  'feminine man'
  'breakfast' (frukost)
  'field' (fält)
  'to think' (fundera)
  'English' (engelska)
  'freezer' (frysbox)
  'flag' (flagga)
  'to have to'

Example of Sámi loanwords in Meänkieli 
  'hill'
  'slope'
  'dark time'
  'porridge'
  'skinny'
  'to smile'
  'ghost'
  'route'

Differences between Finnish and Meänkieli 
Meänkieli lacks two of the grammatical cases used in Standard Finnish, the comitative and the instructive (they are used mostly in literary, official language in Finland, and are rare in all Finnish dialects).

In many situations the letter v in Finnish has become f in Meänkieli.

In many situations the letter u in Finnish has become y in Meänkieli.

In many situations the letter o in Finnish has become u in Meänkieli.

In many situations the letter d has either changed to t or is gone.

Double consonants

See also 
 Demographics of Sweden
 Kven language
 Sweden Finns

References

External links

 Torniolaaksolaiset
 Ridanpää, Juha (2018) Why save a minority language? Meänkieli and rationales of language revitalization. – Fennia : International Journal of Geography 169 (2), 187–203. 

Finnic languages
Finnish dialects
Languages of Sweden
Languages of Finland